Johns Hopkins Ridge is a prominent ridge of the Royal Society Range, Antarctica, running northward from Mount Rucker for . It was mapped by the United States Geological Survey from ground surveys and Navy air photos, and was named by the Advisory Committee on Antarctic Names in 1963 for the Johns Hopkins University of Baltimore, Maryland, which has sent many researchers to Antarctica, and in association with nearby Carleton Glacier and Rutgers Glacier.

References

Ridges of Victoria Land
Johns Hopkins University
Scott Coast